Fashion Story: Model is a 2012 Japanese film directed by Sayaka Nakamura.

Cast
 Tsubasa Honda as Hinako, a young novice fashion model
 Seira Kagami as Miho, a popular veteran model
 Mayuko Kawakita as Rena, a fashion model
 Satomi Tezuka as Morisaki, chief editor
 Yōzaburō Itō as Takuma, a cameraman who is in a relationship with Miho
 Yū Koyanagi as Kōichirō, a male fashion model
 Ayane Nagabuchi
 Ayaka Morita
 Riho Takada
 Maryjun Takahashi
 Yumi Higashino
 Chinami Suzuki
 Nanami Abe
 Kaede Sekikawa
 Megumi Asahina
 Ayane Fukuma
 Saki Toyoba
 Maiko Takahashi
 Tou Katsu
 Takamasa Suga

References

External links
  
 
 Fashion Story: Model at Allcinema 
 Fashion Story: Model at Kinenote 

2012 films
2010s Japanese films